Bahman Kiarostami (born 11 August 1978, in Tehran) is an Iranian film director, cinematographer, film editor and film producer. He is the son of the late critically acclaimed Abbas Kiarostami. The main theme in Kiarostami's films are art and music.

Filmography

Director

Awards 
2019 – Jury Award for Documentary Features, 30th annual New Orleans Film Festival, New Orleans, Louisiana, United States
2012 – Jury Award for Kahrizak, Four Views for the 9th Dubai International Film Festival, Dubai, United Arab Emirates
2004 – "Special Mention" honor for Pilgrimage (Zairat), 26th Festival des 3 Continents, Nantes, France
2003 – Best Director Award for The Light, Beirut Middle East Film Festival, Beirut, Lebanon

References

External links
 
Iranische Filmemacher im Fokus

1978 births
Living people
Iranian cinematographers
Iranian documentary film directors
Iranian film editors
People from Tehran
Iranian documentary film producers